Brachythele is a genus of spiders in the family Nemesiidae. It was first described in 1871 by Ausserer. , it contains 10 species from eastern Europe.

Species
Brachythele comprises the following species:
 Brachythele bentzieni Zonstein, 2007 — Greece
 Brachythele denieri (Simon, 1916) — Greece, Bulgaria
 Brachythele icterica (C. L. Koch, 1838) (type) — Italy, Croatia, North Macedonia
 Brachythele incerta Ausserer, 1871 — Cyprus
 Brachythele langourovi Lazarov, 2005 — Bulgaria
 Brachythele media Kulczyński, 1897 — Slovenia, Croatia, Albania
 Brachythele rhodopensis (Dimitrov & Zonstein, 2022) — Bulgaria
 Brachythele speculatrix Kulczyński, 1897 — SE Europe (Balkans)
 Brachythele varrialei (Dalmas, 1920) — Eastern Europe
 Brachythele zonsteini (Özkütük, Yağmur, Elverici, Gücel, Altunsoy & Kunt, 2022) — Turkey

References

Nemesiidae
Mygalomorphae genera